Runar Normann (born 1 March 1978) is a Norwegian former footballer who played as a winger.

Club career
Normann was born in Harstad, Norway. He previously played for Lillestrøm, Coventry City (where he scored once against Sheffield Wednesday), Brann, Harstad (three times), Vålerenga, St. Hanshaugen, Tromsø and Tromsdalen UIL.

In August 2014 he made comeback for Harstad Reserves of the 5th tier of Norwegian football. In August 2015 he returned to Harstad first-team, of the 3rd tier.

References

External links

1978 births
Living people
People from Harstad
Norwegian footballers
Association football wingers
Lillestrøm SK players
Coventry City F.C. players
SK Brann players
Vålerenga Fotball players
Tromsø IL players
Harstad IL players
Tromsdalen UIL players
Eliteserien players
Premier League players
English Football League players
Norway youth international footballers
Norway under-21 international footballers
Norwegian expatriate footballers
Expatriate footballers in England
Norwegian expatriate sportspeople in England
Sportspeople from Troms og Finnmark